Delta-4-Tetrahydrocannabinol (Delta-4-THC, Δ4-THC, Δ6a(7)-THC) is a synthetic isomer of tetrahydrocannabinol, developed in the 1970s during research to develop improved synthetic routes to the natural forms Δ8-THC and Δ9-THC. Only the (9R, 10aR) enantiomer has been synthesised, though other isomers are possible.

See also
 7,8-Dihydrocannabinol
 Delta-3-Tetrahydrocannabinol
 Delta-7-Tetrahydrocannabinol
 Delta-10-Tetrahydrocannabinol
 Hexahydrocannabinol

References 

Benzochromenes
Cannabinoids